Belgium is divided into distinct geographical regions with slightly different types of fauna.

Birds

Mammals 

Land mammals of Belgium include many of the ones found around Europe. Majority of species are primarily found in the Ardennes. The region is home to red deer, the roe deer, the red fox, the European badger, red squirrel, European hedgehog, along with many other types of European mustelidae, the Eurasian beaver, many kinds of shrews and mice and a great number of species of bats.

See also 
 Outline of Belgium

References

Sources

Geography of Belgium

List of birds of Belgium

List of mammals of Belgium

bch-CBD.naturalsciences.be